Florian Ross (born 1972) is a German jazz pianist, composer and arranger.

Life and career
Ross was born in Pforzheim in 1972.

His debut recording as leader was made for Naxos Records in 1998 – Seasons & Places. In 2011, he was commissioned to write a new arrangement of a Bobby Wellins composition for the Scottish National Jazz Orchestra.

Ross released Ties & Loose Ends, his first recording of his own big band project, in 2013. In the same year, the Florian Ross Elektrio, featuring the leader on Hammond B3 organ, was released.

Discography
An asterisk (*) indicates that the year is that of release.

As leader/co-leader

References

External links

1972 births
German jazz pianists
Living people
People from Pforzheim
21st-century pianists
20th-century jazz composers
  
Bandleaders
Pirouet Records artists
Naxos Records artists